Veronika Grygarová (born 12 April 1991) is a Czech deaf female alpine skier. She represented Czech Republic at the Deaflympics in 2007 and 2015. 

She made her Deaflympic debut at the 2007 Winter Deaflympics and competed in the women's giant slalom, slalom and Super-G events. Veronika also went onto participate at the 2015 Winter Deaflympics and competed in the women's slalom, giant slalom, Super-G, super combined and downhill events. She claimed her only medal in her Deaflympic career as she claimed a silver medal in the downhill category while the gold medal was claimed by her compatriot, Tereza Kmochová in the relevant event.

References 

1991 births
Living people
Czech female alpine skiers
Deaf skiers
Czech deaf people
Deaflympic alpine skiers of the Czech Republic
Alpine skiers at the 2015 Winter Deaflympics
Deaflympic silver medalists for the Czech Republic
Medalists at the 2015 Winter Deaflympics